Ministry of Federal Affairs and General Administration, (MoFAGA), is the ministry of Nepal that supervises activities undertaken by local governments in Nepal.  It also regulates and manages the civil service. 

MoFAGA is the only ministry with direct linkage with the country's municipalities, rural municipalities and provinces. It also plays direct role in implementing various eServices in the local governments.

Background
 In 1972, Local Development Department under then Home affairs and Panchayat Ministry was established.
 In 1982, Local Development Department separately established as Local Development Ministry.
 In 2008, Nepal abolished its monarchy and owned Federalism thus "Federal Affairs" added to "Local Development Ministry".

Divisional Branches
Ministry has seven divisions, namely 
 Federal Affairs Division
 General Administration Division
 Self Governance Division
 Monitoring and Evaluation Division
 Planning and Foreign Aid Co-ordination Division
 Municipality and Environment Management Division and 
 Infrastructure Development Division.

Objectives
The ministry is responsible for enhancing the access of socially and economically disadvantaged groups, region and community to government services.  It is particularly responsible for empowering women, dalits, indigenous peoples, Madheshi, Muslims, disabled and ultra-poor people.

References

Federal Affairs and Local Development